Cardinal Newman High School is a diocesan, Roman Catholic middle and high school outside the city limits of Columbia, South Carolina. It is part of the Roman Catholic Diocese of Charleston.

History

The school moved to a 50-acre campus in unincorporated Richland County near Sesquicentennial State Park in spring 2013 and began instruction there in January 2016.

Academic programs
The school is accredited by the Southern Association of Colleges and Schools, the National Association of Independent Schools, South Carolina Independent School Association, Palmetto Association of Independent Schools, the Association of Supervision and Curriculum Development, and the National Catholic Educational Association.

Feeder schools
In addition to Columbia-area public schools, Cardinal Newman has four Catholic elementary feeder schools: St. Joseph, St. John Neumann, St. Peter and St. Martin de Porres.

Notes and references

External links
 School website

Roman Catholic Diocese of Charleston
Private middle schools in South Carolina
Private high schools in South Carolina
Catholic secondary schools in South Carolina
Schools in Columbia, South Carolina
Educational institutions established in 1858
1858 establishments in South Carolina